Todorovsky is a surname. Notable people with the surname include:

 Pyotr Todorovsky (1925–2013), Soviet and Russian film director, screenwriter, cinematographer, actor, and film score composer
 Valery Todorovsky (born 1962), Soviet and Russian film director, screenwriter, and producer

Russian-language surnames